Lake Hamilton or Hamilton Lake may refer to:
 Hamilton Lake (Alberta), Canada
 Hamilton Lake (Nova Scotia), Canada
 Lake Rotoroa (Hamilton, New Zealand) or Hamilton Lake, a lake in New Zealand
Hamilton Lake (suburb), a residential suburb around Lake Rotoroa in Hamilton, New Zealand
 Lake Hamilton (Arkansas), U.S.
 Lake Hamilton, Arkansas, a community in the U.S.
 Lake Hamilton (Florida), U.S.
 Lake Hamilton, Florida, a town in the U.S.